The Wellfleet Center Historic District is a historic district in Wellfleet, Massachusetts.  It encompasses resources that exemplify the development of the community, beginning in the late 18th century, as a thriving commercial maritime center, and then its rise as a summer resort community in the late 19th century.  Buildings in the district include Cape-style houses from the mid-18th century, 19th century commercial and institutional buildings in the town center, and the 1880s summer estate of Lorenzo Dow Baker.  The district is roughly bounded by Cross St., Holbrook Ave., Main, E. Main and School Streets, and Duck Creek, and was listed on the National Register of Historic Places in 1989.

See also
National Register of Historic Places listings in Barnstable County, Massachusetts

References

Historic districts in Barnstable County, Massachusetts
Wellfleet, Massachusetts
National Register of Historic Places in Barnstable County, Massachusetts
Historic districts on the National Register of Historic Places in Massachusetts